Robert Emmett McGraw (April 10, 1895 – June 2, 1978) was an American professional baseball pitcher for the New York Yankees, Boston Red Sox, Brooklyn Robins, St. Louis Cardinals, and Philadelphia Phillies.

Biography
McGraw was born on April 10, 1895, in La Veta, Colorado.

He went to the University of Colorado and Georgetown University. He was mainly a relief pitcher, although he occasionally started games. He broke into Major League Baseball when he was 22, on September 25, 1917. He was playing for the New York Yankees at the time.

He played for the Yankees until . He was then sent to the Boston Red Sox, where he finished the 1919 season. McGraw went back to the Yankees in 1920; that was the last season he played with them.

McGraw did not play in the major leagues for another five years. He made his comeback with the Brooklyn Robins. Although he only pitched two games for them that year, he came back the next year, and played his first full major league season as a starting pitcher. He went 9-13 that year, a moderate season for someone converting from a relief pitcher to a starting pitcher.

McGraw played part of the 1927 season with the Robins, pitching one game for them before playing the rest (and the majority) of the season with the St. Louis Cardinals. With the Cardinals, most games he pitched in were as a starting pitcher, with some relief appearances.

McGraw played two more seasons in the major leagues, both of which with the Philadelphia Phillies. He went back to relief pitching with them, although he received many decisions.

In 579.1 innings, he had a win–loss record of 28–36, a winning percentage of .406, with an earned run average of 5.00 and 164 strikeouts over nine seasons.

McGraw lived for nearly 50 more years. He died on June 2, 1978, in Boise, Idaho, and was buried in Pueblo, Colorado. He was 83 years old.

References

Bob McGaw at Baseball-Almanac
 MLB.com Historical Player Stats, Bob McGraw

1895 births
1978 deaths
Major League Baseball pitchers
New York Yankees players
Boston Red Sox players
Brooklyn Robins players
Colorado Buffaloes baseball players
Georgetown Hoyas baseball players
St. Louis Cardinals players
Philadelphia Phillies players
Baseball players from Colorado
Newark Bears (IL) players
Vernon Tigers players
Minneapolis Millers (baseball) players
Rochester Red Wings players
Seattle Indians players